Denny Delk (born May 28, 1950) is an American actor. He is best known for providing the voice of Murray in the Monkey Island series as well as a range of voices in LucasArts games.

Background and career
Delk learned a knack of acting from his mother, who read bedtime stories to him and had done all voices of characters. After getting education at University of St. Andrews, he worked as a disc jockey and later got in radio, and then into commercials. In the 1970s he worked with George Lucas for first time, playing a minor role in More American Graffiti for Lucasfilm. He voiced the medical droid 2-1B in The Empire Strikes Back, and later played roles for LucasFilm in Star Wars: Ewoks (the voice of Wicket in the second season) and in Howard the Duck. Then, in 1992, he got up with LucasArts, voicing the "talkie" version of Indiana Jones and the Fate of Atlantis. He continued working for LucasArts as in-house actor, voicing many roles in their games, although players know Delk most for playing the talking skull Murray from Monkey Island series of quests. Delk tried to make character little more comical than he was and tried to give him a bit of himself.

Delk is a freelance voice-over artist, but his name is mostly associated with LucasArts. He also has years of improv experience.

Denny Delk is also known as the spokesman for the long-running Got Milk? series of commercials.

Personal life
Delk lives in San Francisco Bay Area. His wife is writer and producer Karen Jones Delk.

Known works

Films

Video games

References

External links
 
 

Living people
American male voice actors
American radio DJs
American businesspeople
Alumni of the University of St Andrews
1950 births